The Nook HD and Nook HD+ are the third generation of Nook's line of color tablet e-reader/media players by Barnes & Noble for using their copy restricted (DRM) proprietary files, or other files. They are the successors to the Nook Tablet and both were released on November 8, 2012.

The 7-inch version, the Nook HD (also styled NOOK HD), is available in two internal memory sizes - 8 GB (US$129) with approximately 5 GB available for user content, and 16 GB (US$149) with about 13 GB available for user content.  Memory is expandable via a microSD card (up to 64 GB). The Nook HD is available in two colors: Snow (white) and Smoke (black-grey).

A 9-inch version, the Nook HD+ (also styled NOOK HD+), is available with 32 GB ($179) of internal memory.  Its memory is also expandable via a microSD card (up to 64 GB). The Nook HD+ is only available in one color, Slate (black-grey).

When the devices were first introduced, purchasers of the Nook HD or Nook HD+ received an incentive of a $30 gift card to the Barnes & Noble shop. This expired in February 2013.

In May 2013, B&N updated the Nook HD and HD+ to provide full access to the Google Play Store, which allowed users to install apps that were unavailable in the Nook Store.

In June 2013, B&N announced they would stop making Nook tablets in-house. Later, B&N changed its mind and said a new Nook tablet would be released. In June 2014, Barnes & Noble announced it would be teaming up with Samsung to develop co-branded color tablet, the Samsung Galaxy Tab 4 Nook featuring Samsung's hardware with 7-inch and 10.1-inch displays and customized Nook software from Barnes & Noble. The Galaxy Tab 4 Nook began to be sold in the US in August 2014.

History

On June 25, 2013, Barnes & Noble announced it:
"is abandoning its Nook tablet hardware business and will instead rely on a 'partnership model for manufacturing in the competitive color tablet market' that will seek third-party manufacturers to build eReaders that run Nook software."

"The company plans to significantly reduce losses in the NOOK segment by limiting risks associated with manufacturing,” Barnes & Noble said in a press release. “Going forward, the company intends to continue to design eReading devices and reading platforms, while creating a partnership model for manufacturing in the competitive color tablet market. Thus, the widely popular lines of Simple Touch and Glowlight products will continue to be developed in house, and the company’s tablet line will be co-branded with yet to be announced third party manufacturers of consumer electronics products. At the same time, the company intends to continue to build its digital catalog, adding thousands of eBooks every week, and launching new NOOK Apps."

On August 20, 2013 CNET reports B&N reversing the decision to eliminate the Color Nook devices: 
 "The bookseller will continue to design and make Nook color devices, with at least one new Nook set for the holiday season, as its chairman shelves a bid to buy the retail side."

In reporting on Barnes & Noble's June 5, 2014 announcement that the bookseller would be teaming up with Samsung to develop a co-branded tablet, Samsung Galaxy Tab 4 Nook, which was released in August 2014.

Modifying the Nook tablet

Rooting
Developers have found means to root the device, which provides access to hidden files and settings, making it possible to run apps that require deep access to your file system or make dramatic changes to your device.

Alternate operating systems, Android variants and more 
While Nook is a variant of Android (runs the same programs) with a different user interface and bundled software, a more standard variant of Android (CyanogenMod) is available for the Nook and the smartphone/tablet version of Ubuntu operating system to run applications incompatible with Android.

On February 1, 2014, official CyanogenMod 10.2.1 ("Android 4.3 Jelly Bean") was released for the Nook HD and HD+. CyanogenMod versions for Nook HD and Nook HD+ are released for download under the hummingbird and ovation codenames respectively. CyanogenMod releases monthly M-builds ("rolling release") and no versions marked "stable" are to be expected after version 11.0 M6 Release ("Android 4.4.2 KitKat"). The latest version (4.4.4) is available for the Nook HD/Nook HD+ as a "SNAPSHOT" and "NIGHTLIES" versions.

Since August 2013, a developer preview of Ubuntu Touch 13.10 is also available based on the above ovation. Ubuntu Touch can be installed along with Android, allowing dual booting.

File transfer
Transferring a user's files to another computer is possible, provided that the files are not copy restricted by DRM, using the Media Transfer Protocol (MTP) in supported operating systems.

See also
 Comparison of:
 E-book readers
 Tablet computers

References

Barnes & Noble
Android (operating system) devices
Tablet computers introduced in 2012
Tablet computers
Touchscreen portable media players